Before Winter Comes is a 1969 British comedy-drama war film directed by J. Lee Thompson from a screenplay by Andrew Sinclair.

Plot
Before Winter Comes takes place in the immediate aftermath of World War II. British Major Giles Burnside (David Niven) is assigned to an refugee camp in occupied Austria; his mission is to send the groups of displaced civilians to either the Russian zone or the American zone. Burnside is a by-the-book officer but he runs into trouble with the translation of the many different languages. However, one of the refugees, Janovic (Topol), can speak many languages and is willing to help. Janovic quickly conveys Burnside's orders and helps the camp run smoothly. Janovic runs into romance with a lovely innkeeper, Maria (Anna Karina), until he discovers her affair with Burnside. Meanwhile, Janovic is found to be a Red Army deserter, who should be returned to the Soviet authorities to be executed. Burnside offers to help him escape, but Janovic cannot decide whether to trust him.

During a down moment Major Burnside tells a story to Pilkington about a brave Major who tried to defuse a bomb on a bridge by walking into enemy fire. He describes it as a chance to win a medal for bravery. As he finishes, the story switches to a general who reveals that Burnside was the major in question and his "brave" mistake led to the death of some 200 men and his posting to the camp.

Janovic makes a vain attempt at escaping to Switzerland but is captured by Americans and returned to Burnside. As Burnside organises his release to Linz and freedom, he is contacted by the British army who inform him that Jovanovic is to be sent to Freistadt (and his death) to prevent any conflict with the Russians. Burnside reluctantly sends Janovic to Freistadt but conceals it by labelling the truck as Linz. At the last moment, Lieutenant Pilkington arrives and threatens to stop the truck but is ordered not to intervene. Pilkington races after Jovanovic but is too late. 

The film ends with Burnside being assigned to Indonesia and another camp, denied the chance to rejoin his unit. Pilkington visits Maria and breaks down angrily at Burnside. Burnside is commended by his sergeant for being a fine officer while the film ends with Janovic in a truck surrounded by Russian soldiers, his fate unknown.

Cast
 David Niven as Major Burnside
 Topol as Janovic
 Anna Karina as Maria
 John Hurt as Lieutenant Pilkington
 Anthony Quayle as Brigadier Bewley
 Ori Levy as Captain Kamenev
 John Collin as Sergeant Woody
 Karel Stepanek as Count Kerassy
 Guy Deghy as Kovacs
 Mark Malicz as Komenski
 Gertan Klauber as Russian major
 Hana Maria Pravda as Beata
 George Innes as Bill
 Tony Selby as Ted
 Hugh Futcher as Joe
 Chris Sandford as Johnny
 Colin Spaull as Alf
 Larry Dann as Al
 Jeffry Wickham as Captain Roots
 Alysoun Austin as A.T.S. driver
 John Savident as British corporal

Production
The film was based on a short story The Interpreter which had appeared in The New Yorker. Screenwriter Andrew Sinclair says David Niven insisted on a title change as he did not play the interpreter.

J. Lee Thompson said he made the film to return to more intimate dramas of earlier in his career such as Woman in a Dressing Gown.

Niven's fee was $250,000. It was an early screen role for Topol, who had become famous playing Fiddler on the Roof on stage in London. J. Lee Thompson called Topol "the Frank Sinatra of Israel, rugged, handsome, a Clark Gable type or a European version of Burt Lancaster."

Filming took place south of Salzburg. John Hurt recalled "Niven was very helpful" during the shoot "because Chaim (Topol) was being difficult and tricksy."

Release
The film opened at the Sutton Theatre in New York City on 24 March 1969 and grossed $17,846 in its first week.

See also
 Hogan's Heroes

References

External links

Before Winter Comes at TCMDB
Before Winter Comes at Letterbox DVD
Before Winter Comes at BFI

1969 films
Films set in 1945
Films set in Austria
Films shot in Austria
1960s English-language films
Films directed by J. Lee Thompson
1969 drama films
British war drama films
Columbia Pictures films
Films scored by Ron Grainer
Films about deserters
British World War II films
1960s British films